Hadım Hafız Ahmed Pasha (usually referred to as Hafız Ahmed Pasha; died November 3, 1613) was an Ottoman statesman who served as the governor of Egypt from 1590 or 1591 to 1594. Previously, he had served as governor (beylerbey) of Cyprus, and he became a vizier along with his appointment to Egypt. After Egypt, he became the governor of Bursa from 1594 to 1595. His epithet Hadım means "eunuch" in Turkish.

He commanded the victorious Ottoman forces during sultan Mehmed III's siege of Eger in 1606. After a string of various government and military roles, Ahmed Pasha retired in 1607 or 1608. He died on November 3, 1613.

See also
 List of Ottoman governors of Egypt

References

 Süreyya, Bey M, Nuri Akbayar, and Seyit A. Kahraman. Sicill-i Osmanî. Beşiktaş, İstanbul: Kültür Bakanlığı ile Türkiye Ekonomik ve Toplumsal Tarih Vakfı'nın ortak yayınıdır, 1996. Print.

16th-century births
Year of birth unknown
1613 deaths
16th-century Ottoman governors of Egypt
17th-century people from the Ottoman Empire
Ottoman governors of Egypt
Pashas
Eunuchs from the Ottoman Empire
Ottoman governors of Cyprus